Kala, also known as Kela, is an Austronesian language spoken by about 2200 people (in 2002) in several villages along the south coast of the Huon Gulf between Salamaua Peninsula and the Paiawa River, Morobe Province, Papua New Guinea.

Overview
The principal villages from north to south are:
Salamaua Rural LLG
Manindala (also known as Kela)
Lambu (also known as Logui)
Apoze (also known as Laukanu)
Kamiali (also known as Lababia)
Morobe Rural LLG
Alẽso (also known as Buso)
Kui

There are four dialects of Kala. The three southern villages share a dialect with very minor differences found in the village of Kui while each of the northern villages has its own dialect.

Linguistically, Kala belongs to the North Huon Gulf languages and Kala-speakers appear to have arrived on the southern coast of the Gulf relatively recently, beginning perhaps as late as the 17th century (Bradshaw 1997).

Phonology 
Kala has five basic vowels (listed below), as well as contrastive nasal vowels. 

The consonants of Kala are listed below.  

The voiced alveolar fricative  only exists in the dialects spoken in Apoze and Lambu villages.

In 2010, anthropologists from the University of British Columbia, Okanagan campus, worked in a collaborative project with the Kala Language Committee, a group of individuals concerned with strengthening Kala language amongst their communities, to decide on a Kala orthographic system. The practical writing system for Kala includes the following letters: . The committee chose the tilde symbol to represent nasal vowels in their practical writing system as it reminded them of ocean waves (called  in Kala) since they are coastal people.

Morphology

Names
Like most of the languages around the Huon Gulf, Kala has a system of birth order names (Holzknecht 1989: 43-45, Devolder et al 2012). Each dialect has their own terms for birth-order names. Compare Numbami.

Dialects 
Kala is spoken in six villages along the Huon Gulf, and as such is split into different dialects. The most significant differences, which are phonological and lexical, exist between the northernmost three villages and the southernmost, however, differences also exist between the individual villages, especially for Manindala (Kela) in the north. This dialect contains syllable codas, which no other dialect shows. 

 'sandfly' (Apoze, Kamiali, Alẽso, Kui)

 'sandfly' (Lambu)

 'sandfly' (Manindala) 

 'yam' (Apoze, Kamiali, Alẽso, Kui)

 'yam' (Lambu)

 'yam' (Manindala) 

 'snake' (Lambu, Alẽso, Kamiali, Kui) 
 'snake' (Apoze)

 'snake' (Manindala)

 'turtle' (Kamiali, Alẽso, Kui) 
 'turtle' (Apoze)
 'turtle' (Lambu)
 'turtle' (Manindala)

References

 Bradshaw, Joel (1997). "The population kaleidoscope: Another factor in the Melanesian diversity v. Polynesian homogeneity debate." Journal of the Polynesian Society 106: 222-249.
 DeVolder, Chara, Christine Schreyer and John Wagner, eds. (2012). Kala Kaŋa Bi Ŋa Kapia – Diksineri bilong Tok Ples Kala (Kala Dictionary).  Kelowna: Centre for Social, Spatial and Economic Justice.
 Holzknecht, Susanne (1989). The Markham languages of Papua New Guinea. Series C-115. Canberra: Pacific Linguistics.
 Johnson, Morris (1994). Kela organised phonology data. 
 Schreyer, Christine (2015). Community Consensus and Social Identity in Alphabet Development: The relationship between Kala and Jabêm. Written Language and Literacy, 18(1): 175-199.

Languages of Morobe Province
North Huon Gulf languages